The 1988 World Doubles Championships was a women's tennis tournament played on indoor carpet courts in Tokyo in Japan and was part of the 1988 WTA Tour. The tournament ran from 25 November through 27 November 1988.

Winners

Women's doubles

 Katrina Adams /  Zina Garrison defeated  Gigi Fernández /  Robin White 7–5, 7–5
 It was Adams' 3rd title of the year and the 4th of her career. It was Garrison's 5th title of the year and the 15th of her career.

External links
 Women's Tennis Association (WTA) tournament edition details
 International Tennis Federation (ITF) tournament edition details

World Doubles Championships
WTA Doubles Championships
November 1988 sports events in Asia